The 2000 Dutch Open was an ATP men's tennis tournament staged in Amsterdam, Netherlands and played on outdoor clay courts. It was the 41st edition of the tournament and was held from 17 July until 23 July 2000.  Fourth-seeded Magnus Gustafsson won the singles title.

Finals

Singles

 Magnus Gustafsson defeated  Raemon Sluiter, 6–7(4–7), 6–3, 7–6(7–5), 6–1
 It was Gustafsson's his 14th and last title of his career.

Doubles

 Sergio Roitman /  Andrés Schneiter defeated  Edwin Kempes /  Dennis van Scheppingen 4–6, 6–4, 6–1

References

External links
 ITF tournament edition details

Dutch Open (tennis)
Energis Dutch Open, 2000
2000 in Dutch tennis
Energis Dutch Open, 2000